Michael Lee Chun-keung (born 22 August 1976) is a Hong Kong engineer and politician. Currently serving as the vice-chairperson of Liberal Party, he was elected as a member of Legislative Council for the Election Committee constituency heavily skewed the pro-Beijing camp.

Early years 
Lee grew up in the Eastern District on Hong Kong Island, whose father ran business on electronic engineering. Lee studied in Clementi Secondary School, and pursued his university studying in Lehigh University, Pennsylvania. He returned to Hong Kong after graduated with Bachelor of Science in Electronic engineering in 1997, and worked in electronic companies.

Political career 
In 2011 local election, Lee ran in Tsui Tak constituency in Eastern District as the pro-Beijing and pro-business Liberal Party candidate. He beat the incumbent councillor Lui Chi-man and won the seat. He was re-elected in 2015, but was voted out of office in 2019 following the massive pro-democracy protest movement.

Lee became vice-chairman of the Liberal Party in 2016, and entered the Election Committee, a powerful group heavily skewed the pro-Beijing camp that will elect the Chief Executive, in the same year. He was re-elected as the Committee member in 2021, and was later elected as Legislative Council member.

Lee was also appointed as member of several governmental committees.

During the 2021 Hong Kong legislative election, Lee described himself as an engineer. However, after the elections, in his declaration of interests to the government, Lee declared that his sole job since February 2021 was actually an executive at a parking lot management company.

Personal life 
Lee married Irene Choi in 2003 and had a son and a daughter together.

Electoral performances

References

External links 

Living people
1976 births
Liberal Party (Hong Kong) politicians
HK LegCo Members 2022–2025
Members of the Election Committee of Hong Kong, 2021–2026